Samsung's Galaxy A5 (2016) or Samsung Galaxy A5 2016 Edition is an Android smartphone developed by Samsung.

Hardware
Samsung Galaxy A5 (2016) is powered by the Exynos 7580 (Exynos 7 Octa) SoC with 1.6GHz octa-core 64-bit processor and Mali T720-MP2 graphics processor. The smartphone has 2 GB RAM and 16 GB eMMC internal storage with support for removable MicroSD cards of up to 128 GB. The device's MicroSD card allows insertion of a SIM card, thus it can also be used in Dual SIM mode.

Extended hardware details

Display 

 Technology: Super AMOLED
 Size: 5.2 inches (132mm)
 Resolution: 1080x1920 (Full HD)
 Colour depth: 16M
 Pixel density: 424 PPI
 S Pen support: No

Memory 

 RAM: 8GB
 ROM: 256GB
 External Memory Support (microSD slot): Up to 128GB

Sensors 

 Accelerometer, Geomagnetic Sensor, Hall Sensor, Proximity Sensor, RGB Light Sensor

Audio and Video 

 Video Recording Resolution: FHD (1920 x 1080 pixels) 30fps
 Video Playing Formats: MP4, M4V, 3GP, 3G2, WMV, ASF, AVI, FLV, MKV, WEBM
 Video Playing Resolutions: FHD (1920 x 1080 pixels) 30fps
 Audio Playing Formats: MP3, M4A, 3GA, AAC, OGG, OGA, WAV, WMA, AMR, AWB, FLAC, MID, MIDI, XMF, MXMF, IMY, RTTTL, RTX, OTA

Cameras

Main (back) camera 

 Single 13 MP CMOS, f/1.9 aperture, flash, auto-focus

Front camera 

 Single 5 MP CMOS, f/1.9 aperture, fixed focus

Connectivity 

 ANT+: Yes
 USB Version: 2.0
 Location Technologies: GPS, GLONASS
 Audio Port: 3.5mm audio jack
 MHL: No
 Wi-Fi: 802.11 b/g/n 2.4GHz
 Wi-Fi Direct: Yes
 DLNA Support: No
 NFC: Yes
 Bluetooth Version: 4.1
 Bluetooth Profiles: A2DP, AVRCP, DI, HFP, HID, HOGP, HSP, MAP, OPP, PAN, PBAP, SAP
 PC Sync. Samsung Smart Switch

Battery 

 Standard Battery Capacity: 2900mAh, not removable
 Fast charging: Yes
 Stated Internet Usage Time (3G): up to 14h
 Stated Internet Usage Time (LTE): up to 14h
 Stated Internet Usage Time (Wi-Fi): up to 16h
 Stated Video Playback Time: up to 14h
 Stated Audio Playback Time: up to 75h
 Stated Talk time: up to 16h (3G W-CDMA)

Design
Samsung Galaxy A5 (2016) has an aluminium and glass body, unlike Samsung Galaxy A5 (2015), the A5 (2016) has a larger 5.2-inch display compared to the 5-inch display of predecessor Galaxy A5. The A5 (2016)’s display is protected by Corning Gorilla Glass 4, also on the back side of the phone.

Software
The Samsung Galaxy A5 (2016) launched with the Android 5.1.1 "Lollipop" operating system. Samsung has released the Android 6.0.1 "Marshmallow" update and Android 7.0 "Nougat" update for it. Features of the Samsung Galaxy A5 (2016) include Samsung Pay (MST) capabilities and S Voice voice recognition technology.

Availability
Samsung Galaxy A5 (2016) was released in China on 15 December 2015. As of April 2016, the Samsung Galaxy A5 (2016) is now available in Europe, Africa, Latin America and Asia.

Variants

See also
 Samsung Galaxy A5 (2015)
Samsung Galaxy A5 (2017)
 Samsung Galaxy A8 (2016)
 Samsung Galaxy A3
 Samsung Galaxy A7
 Samsung Galaxy Alpha

References

External links
 GSMArena
 PhoneArena Review
 Harga Samsung Galaxy A5

Android (operating system) devices
Samsung mobile phones
Samsung Galaxy
Mobile phones introduced in 2015
Discontinued smartphones